Dr. Sun Yat-sen's Mausoleum is situated at the foot of the second peak of Purple Mountain in Nanjing, China. Construction of the tomb started in January 1926, and was finished in spring of 1929. The architect was Lü Yanzhi, who died shortly after it was finished. His representative and project partner was his close friend Huang Tanpu.

History 
Dr. Sun was born in Guangdong province of China on 12 November 1866, and died in 1925 in Beijing, China. On 23 April 1929, the Chinese government appointed He Yingqin to be in charge of laying Dr. Sun to rest. On 26 May, the coffin departed from Beijing, and on 28 May, it arrived in Nanjing. On 1 June 1929, Dr. Sun was buried there. Sun, considered to be the "Father of Modern China" both in mainland China and in Taiwan, fought against the imperial Qing government and after the 1911 revolution ended the monarchy, and founded the Republic of China.

Selection of the design 

A committee decided to host a design competition in order to collect designs for the Sun Yat-sen Mausoleum. The committee put advertisements in the newspapers on 5 May 1925, inviting architects and designers at home and abroad to send their designs. In exchange for a 10 yuan charge, the committee would provide the designer with 12 pictures of the site. The design would have to adhere to guidelines. It had to be done in a traditional Chinese style that also evoked a modern design with special and memorial substance. Not only should it evoke the Chinese architectural spirit, but also add creativity. Designers were required to insure that the proposed construction costs within 300,000 yuan (the final cost exceeded 3,000,000 Yuan). Over 40 proposals were received. On 20 September 1925, the committee convened in Shanghai, and unanimously selected Lu Yanzhi's proposal.

The mausoleum was designed by Lu Yanzhi and completed by Poy Gum Lee between 1926 and 1929.

Architecture 

Reclining on a mountain slope, the majestic mausoleum blends the styles of traditional imperial tombs and modern architecture. There is a three-tier stone stand on which a huge bronze ding, an ancient Chinese vessel symbolizing power, perches. To the north of the square, the paifang towers high. On both sides, pine, cypress, and ginkgo trees guard the way. The tri-arched marble gate is inscribed with the personal motto of Dr. Sun, with four Chinese characters written by him, "Tian Xia Wei Gong" ("天下爲公") which means "What is under heaven is for all". Inside the gate, there is a pavilion in which a  stele is set, which is a memorial monument set by the Kuomintang (KMT). A few stairs up is the sacrificial hall and the vault.

In front of the sacrificial hall there stands a pair of huabiao, ancient Chinese ornamental columns, which are 12.6 meters high. In the center of the hall a -high statue of Dr. Sun sits. The statue was sculptured out of Italian white marble. The hall's ceiling features the flag of the Kuomintang. Biographical information on Dr. Sun is available to visitors in the hall. North of the hall lies the bell-shaped vault, wherein lies the marble false sarcophagus of Dr. Sun. Dr Sun's body is interred in a burial chamber 5m below the marble false sarcophagus in a bronze coffin.

Architectural influence of the Mausoleum's design is evident in Taiwan's Chiang Kai-shek Memorial Hall.

High profile visits

In a historical documentary, Chiang Kai Shek, former President of the Republic of China, officiated the opening and paid his visit to Mausoleum reporting his victory of the Northern Expedition to unify China in 1929. Chiang also made a second visit in summer of 1946 after the conclusion of the Second World War to report the victory for his cause that mainland China was once again in Chinese sovereignty.

On 27 April 2005, Kuomintang (KMT) Chairman Lien Chan, his wife, and other KMT members visited the Mausoleum. It was the first visit of KMT members to the site since 1949.

On 15 November 2006, a visit was made to the Mausoleum by Dr. Sun's granddaughter, Sun Huiying, who was by then over eighty years old.

In May 2008, Wu Po-hsiung became the first ruling KMT Chairman to visit the Sun Yat-sen Mausoleum since 1949. There were concerns that the 392 steps leading to the tomb would be too taxing given Wu's leg injuries.

On 12 February 2014, Wang Yu-chi became the first ROC government official in office to visit the site after the end of the Chinese Civil War in 1949.

On 31 October 2016, KMT Chairwoman Hung Hsiu-chu visited the mausoleum during her mainland trip for the Cross-strait Peace Development Forum.

Modifications 
In 1981, Lily Sun, a granddaughter of Sun Yat-sen, visited the mausoleum. The flag of the KMT had been removed from the ceiling at the time of her visit, but was later restored. In May 2011 on another visit, she was surprised to find the four characters "General Rules of Meetings", a document that Sun wrote in reference to Robert's Rules of Order had been removed from a stone carving.

Gallery

See also
National Chiang Kai-shek Memorial Hall
Cihu Mausoleum
Ching-kuo Memorial Hall
Touliao Mausoleum
Linggu Temple and Tomb of Tan Yankai
Plum Blossom Mountain in Nanjing (Former Tomb of Wang Jingwei, demolished in 1946)
Tomb of Hu Hanmin at Longyandong, Guangzhou
Wu Zhihui Memorial park in Kinmen
Yangmingshan Cemetery, Beitou District, Taipei
 Sun Yat Sen Nanyang Memorial Hall
 Sun Yat-sen Memorial Hall
 Sun Yat Sen Memorial House
 Sun Yat-sen Museum Penang
 Sun Yat Sen Memorial Park
Sun Yat-sen Mausoleum Music Stage,Music stage located near the mausoleum.

References

External links

Dr. Sun Yat-sen Mausoleum national park

Monuments and memorials to Sun Yat-sen
Mausoleums in China
Buildings and structures in Nanjing
Parks in Nanjing
Buildings and structures completed in 1929
Major National Historical and Cultural Sites in Jiangsu
AAAA-rated tourist attractions
Tourist attractions in Nanjing
Cemeteries in Nanjing